Making a Murderer is an American true crime documentary television series written and directed by Laura Ricciardi and Moira Demos. The show tells the story of Steven Avery, a man from Manitowoc County, Wisconsin, who served 18 years in prison (1985-2003) after his wrongful conviction for the sexual assault and attempted murder of Penny Beerntsen. He was later charged with and convicted of the 2005 murder of Teresa Halbach. The connected story is that of Avery's nephew Brendan Dassey, who was accused and convicted as an accessory in the murder of Halbach.

The first season mainly chronicles the period between 1985 and 2007, portraying Avery's 1985 arrest and conviction, his subsequent exoneration and release in 2003, the civil lawsuit Avery filed against Manitowoc County, his 2005 arrest, and his ensuing trial and conviction in 2007. It also depicts the arrest, prosecution, and conviction of Dassey, focusing on the accusations of coercion and attorney ineptitude.

The second season explores the aftermath of both Avery's and Dassey's convictions, focusing on Avery's and Dassey's families, the investigation and findings of Avery's new attorney Kathleen Zellner, which supported the thesis of Avery's innocence and him being framed for the murder of Halbach, and Dassey's legal team's efforts in arguing that his confession was coerced by prosecutors and his constitutional rights were violated.

The first season premiered on Netflix on December 18, 2015. It was filmed over the course of 10 years, with the filmmakers moving back and forth from New York City to Wisconsin during filming. To promote the series, Netflix released the first episode concurrently on YouTube and on Netflix, which it had not done for any other original programming.

In July 2016, Netflix announced the second season, to explore the aftermath of Dassey's conviction and the numerous appeals that had taken place. The 10-episode second season was released on October 19, 2018.

Making a Murderer won several awards, including four Primetime Emmy Awards in 2016. As a production, the series was favorably compared to the HBO series The Jinx and the podcast Serial. Making a Murderer was widely viewed and has generated considerable controversy, both in Manitowoc County, the setting of events, and nationwide. A petition in December 2015 to the White House to pardon Avery garnered more than 500,000 signatures. The White House's statement noted "the President cannot pardon a state criminal offense."

Subject matter

Making a Murderer details the life of Steven Avery, a man whose family owned an auto salvage yard in Manitowoc County, Wisconsin. In 1985, Avery was arrested and convicted of the sexual assault of Penny Beerntsen, despite having an alibi. After serving 18 years in prison, Avery was exonerated with the aid of the Innocence Project, when the DNA in the case was matched to another man. After Avery was released from prison in 2003, he filed a $36 million civil lawsuit against Manitowoc County and several county officials associated with his arrest and conviction.

Two years later, in 2005, Avery was arrested and charged with the murder of Teresa Halbach, a photographer who disappeared after she photographed a vehicle at Avery's salvage yard. The handling of the Halbach murder case was highly controversial. Steven Avery and his lawyers argued that he had once again been "set up". Bloodstains recovered from the interior of Halbach's car matched Avery's DNA. Avery maintained that the murder charge was a frameup, promulgated to discredit his pending civil case. His attorneys accused Manitowoc officials of evidence tampering after a vial of Avery's blood, stored in an evidence locker since the 1985 trial, was found with broken container seals and a puncture hole in the stopper, suggesting that blood from the vial could have been used to plant incriminating evidence in the victim's vehicle. The Avery tube contained ethylenediamine-tetraacetic acid (EDTA), which prevents blood coagulation and degradation. EDTA is not naturally present in human blood, and the defense argued that if EDTA was found in the crime scene blood, it would prove the blood was planted. While the tampering charge was never substantiated, accusations of prosecutorial misconduct have persisted. The series further explores issues and procedures in the Manitowoc County Sheriff's Department that led to Avery's original conviction, and suggests that the department had a conflict of interest in investigating Halbach's murder.

The series also covers the arrest, prosecution, and conviction of Avery's nephew, Brendan Dassey, who was accused and convicted as an accessory to the murder, based largely on his confession under interrogation. The series depicts his trial, along with subsequent accusations of coercion and ineffective assistance of counsel.

On August 12, 2016, Dassey had his conviction overturned by a federal judge on the grounds that he was unconstitutionally coerced by the police into confessing to the murder, and this was the only substantial evidence in the case. On November 14, 2016, Federal District Court Judge William Duffin ordered Dassey's release from prison within 90 days if Wisconsin prosecutors did not move forward with a retrial. On November 17, the U.S. Court of Appeals for the Seventh Circuit blocked Dassey's release while the appeal was being heard. A three-judge panel from the 7th Circuit affirmed Judge Duffin's decision to release Dassey, and stated that Dassey should be freed unless the state chose to retry him. In December 2017, an en banc panel of seven judges of the United States Court of Appeals for the Seventh Circuit ruled in favor of upholding the original conviction, in a split vote of 4 to 3, ruling that police had properly obtained Dassey's confession. In June 2018, the U.S. Supreme Court declined to hear Dassey's appeal of the 7th Circuit's en banc decision.

In other media
The story of the crime for which Avery was initially charged and imprisoned was featured in the Radiolab episode, "Are You Sure?" (airdate March 26, 2013), in the segment "Reasonable Doubt". The show featured an interview with Penny Beerntsen, the subject of the attack for which Avery was wrongfully convicted.

Persons featured

Avery family
 Steven Avery – Wrongfully convicted of a sexual assault, for which he served an 18-year sentence. Defendant convicted of Halbach's murder.
 Allan Avery – Steven Avery's father
 Dolores Avery – Steven Avery's mother
 Chuck Avery – Steven Avery's brother
 Earl Avery – Steven Avery's brother
 Barb Dassey – Steven Avery's sister, mother of Brendan and Bobby Dassey
 Brendan Dassey – Avery's nephew, son of Barb Dassey, defendant convicted of assisting Avery in Halbach's murder.
 Bobby Dassey – Brendan Dassey's brother, son of Barb Dassey
 Scott Tadych – married Barb Dassey (before the trials), stepfather of her children
 Kayla Avery – Brendan Dassey's cousin
 Kim Ducat – Steven Avery's cousin
 Carla Chase - Steven Avery's niece, Brendan Dassey's cousin
 Brad Dassey - Brendan's half brother, voice actor, and aspiring rapper.

Victims
 Penny Beerntsen – Victim of a sexual assault and attempted murder in 1985, for which Steven Avery was wrongfully convicted
 Teresa Halbach – Murder victim in 2005
 Rape victim of Gregory Allen, convicted for an attempted rape on Penny Beerntsen.

Defense lawyers
 Kathleen Zellner – post-conviction attorney for Steven Avery
 Dean Strang – for Steven Avery
 Jerome Buting – for Steven Avery
 Robert Henak – post-conviction attorney for Steven Avery
 Stephen Glynn – civil rights lawyer for Steven Avery
 Len Kachinsky – Brendan Dassey's first appointed lawyer
 Mark Fremgen – for Brendan Dassey, appointed lawyer (second lawyer)
 Ray Edelstein – for Brendan Dassey, appointed lawyer (second lawyer)
 Steven Drizin – post-conviction attorney for Brendan Dassey
 Robert Dvorak – post-conviction attorney for Brendan Dassey 
 Laura Nirider – post-conviction attorney for Brendan Dassey

Prosecution 
 Denis Vogel – Manitowoc County District Attorney, prosecuted Avery's 1985 sexual assault case
 Ken Kratz – special prosecutor, district attorney of Calumet County, Wisconsin, prosecuted Halbach murder case
 Norm Gahn – special prosecutor, assistant district attorney of Milwaukee County

Judges
 Patrick Willis – Manitowoc County Circuit Court Judge, presided over Steven Avery's trial
 Jerome Fox – Manitowoc County Circuit Court Judge, presided over Brendan Dassey's trial
 Angela Sutkiewicz - Manitowoc County Circuit Court Judge, presides over Steven Avery's appeals

Law enforcement
 Tom Kocourek – Manitowoc County Sheriff (1979–2001)
 Kenneth Petersen – Manitowoc County Sheriff (2001–07)
 Gene Kusche – Manitowoc County Chief Deputy Sheriff at time of Avery's 1985 trial
 James Lenk – lieutenant, Manitowoc County Sheriff's Department
 Andrew Colborn – sergeant, Manitowoc County Sheriff's Department
 Judy Dvorak – deputy, Manitowoc County Sheriff's Department
 Tom Fassbender – investigator, Wisconsin Division of Criminal Investigation, lead investigator in Halbach murder trial
 Mark Wiegert – sergeant, Calumet County Sheriff's Department
 Jerry Pagel – Calumet County Sheriff

Private investigators
 Michael O'Kelly – investigator hired by Len Kachinsky

Production
The series was written and directed by filmmakers Laura Ricciardi and Moira Demos. They met as graduate students in Columbia University's film program. The two learned about Avery after reading a 2005 article in The New York Times about his 2003 exoneration and 2005 arrest for murder. Both thought that his case could be an interesting subject for a documentary.

Before meeting with Netflix, Demos and Ricciardi met with executives at PBS and HBO, but neither network was interested in the project. Netflix originally planned an eight-episode first season, but later expanded its order to 10.

The show's graphics and main title sequence were completed by Santa Monica–based design studio Elastic.

Reception

Critical response
The series alternately received praise and criticism from critics. Some praised its comprehensive nature, and the first season has an approval rating of 98% on Rotten Tomatoes, based on 40 reviews, with an average rating of 8.65 out of 10. The site's critical consensus describes Making a Murderer as "a spellbinding slow burn that effectively utilizes the documentary format to tell a twisty mystery." On Metacritic, the first season has a weighted average score of 84 out of 100, based on 21 critics, indicating "universal acclaim". Lenika Cruz, writing for The Atlantic, commended the series for its "sense of total immersion". Mike Hale, for The New York Times, described it as giving an:

Some critics, however, have described Making a Murderer as one-sided and emotionally manipulative.<ref>{{cite news |url=http://www.slate.com/articles/arts/culturebox/2016/01/making_a_murderer_is_so_emotionally_manipulative_it_left_me_angry.html |title=The Emotional Manipulations of Making a Murderer' |work=Slate |first=Bronwen |last=Dickey |date=January 15, 2016 |access-date=January 20, 2016}}</ref> Prosecutor Ken Kratz claimed that key evidence from the trial was omitted from the documentary, claiming that, on one of Halbach's previous visits, Avery had come to the door in his towel, and that Halbach "said she wouldn't go back because she was scared of him."Making a Murderer has been compared to The Jinx, a miniseries on HBO, and Serial, a podcast. All three series investigate criminal cases: The Jinx detailed murders allegedly committed by Robert Durst. The first season of Serial dealt with the Killing of Hae Min Lee.

The second season received positive reviews from critics, although less acclaimed than the first season. On Rotten Tomatoes, it has a 71% approval rating based on 35 reviews, with an average rating of 6.52 out of 10. The site's critical consensus is, "Making a Murderers return may not yield closure for this maddening saga of crime and punishment, but the series' exploration of the U.S. justice system remains riveting." On Metacritic, it has a score of 67 out of 100, based on 11 critics, indicating "generally favorable reviews".

Accolades

Public reaction
The series gained a very large international audience. Some celebrities, including Alec Baldwin, Ricky Gervais, and Mandy Moore, praised the series on social media.

A petition to the White House that requested pardons for Avery and Dassey garnered more than 128,000 signatures. The White House responded that, as the convictions were made in state court, the President had no authority to pardon either defendant. Then-governor Scott Walker of Wisconsin said he would not consider a pardon.

Dassey is being represented by the Center on Wrongful Convictions of Youth at Northwestern University. Appeals within the state courts failed, but his conviction was overturned in federal district court on August 12, 2016, by a Magistrate Judge, based on the unconstitutional coercion of his confession. His defense team had petitioned the court to hear his case on habeas corpus grounds.  The U.S. Court of Appeals for the Seventh Circuit granted a stay of the release on November 16, 2016, pending resolution of the appeal.

As of January 9, 2016, Avery was being represented by Kathleen Zellner, a noted Chicago-area attorney, and Tricia Bushnell, legal director of the Midwest Innocence Project. In April 2019 Bushnell stopped representing Avery.

Local reporters' comments

Local reporter Angenette Levy was interviewed after the series and said: "I did notice there were some parts of the state's theory, and some other things that weren't discussed in the documentary," but she also noted that it was a six-week trial with much evidence reviewed in court. She said she was surprised that the trial, which she found compelling on many levels, had not received more national attention when it was being conducted. She found Dassey's conviction "tragic," as was Avery's wrongful conviction in 1985 but did not comment on the conviction in the Halbach case. TV reporter Diana Alvear wrote on her blog that she believed Halbach's life and character deserved more coverage in the series. Other local reporters said that the case still weighed on them nearly a decade after the trial.

Law enforcement comments

In an interview with the Manitowoc Herald Times Reporter, Sheriff Robert Hermann criticized the series, calling it "skewed" and not objective, but he admitted he had not watched it.

According to Fox local news, Ken Kratz, the former Calumet County district attorney who prosecuted Avery, said that he had not been able to give his side of the story. In another interview, he said that in 2013 Demos and Ricciardi denied him an opportunity for an interview. The documentary makers said this statement was false, as it was Kratz who refused an interview.

In an interview with People magazine, Kratz has said that the Netflix documentary left out key pieces of evidence against Steven Avery. He said Avery used a fake name when requesting Halbach as a photographer, and that he had placed three calls to her cell phone on October 31. Kratz said Halbach's cellphone, camera and PDA were found near Avery's trailer. He noted other physical evidence that was found in the firepit on Avery's property, and that Avery's DNA was found on the hood latch of the victim's car. A ballistics report indicated that the bullet found in the garage was fired by Avery's rifle. In an email sent to The Wrap, Kratz alleged that while in prison for the rape conviction, Avery told another inmate of his intent to build a "torture chamber" to use for young women when he was released.

In February 2017, Kratz published a book titled Avery: The Case Against Steven Avery and What "Making a Murderer" Gets Wrong.

Filmmakers' response
The filmmakers have said that they gave prosecutors an opportunity to answer questions, but that Kratz refused invitations to be interviewed for the series. Demos and Ricciardi said they believed the documentary was fair and included the most significant evidence of the six-week trial, including much of the state's key evidence. Demos said that Kratz "is going on television and lodging accusations against us. Much of what he says, simply his facts are not true. It's not about 'do we include it, do we not include it', they simply are not facts." The filmmakers maintain that their documentary was thorough, accurate, and fair.

Strang comments
Dean Strang, one of Avery's attorneys for the Halbach trial, stated the filmmakers did "a good editorial job" with the documentary. Strang noted that the trial lasted for six weeks and featured approximately 200 to 240 hours of evidence. Strang believes that showing the full trial would have been too long for audiences and that only the most significant points on both sides could be shown. He disagreed that significant evidence was left out.

Comments by other involved parties 
Jodi Stachowski, a former fiancée of Avery's, defended him in the documentary. But, during an interview on HLN's Nancy Grace in January 2016, she was asked whether she believes Avery killed Halbach. She said, "Yes, I do, because he threatened to kill me and my family and a friend of mine." Stachowski also said that Avery forced her to lie to Netflix producers, threatening that otherwise she would "pay for it." She quoted other alleged comments by him.

The Halbach family stated they were "saddened to learn that individuals and corporations continue to create entertainment and to seek profit from their loss." In a People article, Kay Giordana, Halbach's aunt, was quoted as saying that the documentary was "terrible" and "unfortunate", and

not even close to what really happened. Everybody has their own side of a story. That is the Avery family's side of the story. I wouldn't expect it to be different. They think he is innocent. I am not surprised. I am surprised that someone would put that together in that way and have it [be] one-sided." She added that Avery is "100 percent guilty. No doubt about it."

Halbach's cousin-in-law, Jeremy Fournier, described the documentary as "very one-sided" and feels that viewers are "only getting one side of the story."

Beerntsen, whose testimony contributed to the wrongful conviction of Avery for rape, declined to be interviewed for Making a Murderer. Beerntsen had previously apologized to Avery, in 2003, after learning of his exoneration; they later met and collaborated on The Forgiveness Project. In a 2016 interview, Beerntsen said she had watched the show and that its portrayal of her case was accurate. However, as to the murder of Halbach, Beerntsen expressed that she was "not convinced" of his innocence, and that she had refused to speak to the documentary's producers for being "too close with Avery’s family and attorneys".

Episodes
Season 1 (2015)

Season 2 (2018)

 See also 
 The Confession Tapes''

References

External links
 
 

2015 American television series debuts
2018 American television series endings
2010s American documentary television series
English-language Netflix original programming
Netflix original documentary television series
True crime television series
Television series about conspiracy theories
Television controversies in the United States
Television shows scored by Gustavo Santaolalla
Manitowoc County, Wisconsin